Goran Slavkovski (born 8 April 1989) is a former professional footballer who played as a forward. He made his only Serie A appearance for Inter Milan at the age of 17 years and 1 month – a then club record. Born in Sweden, he represented the Macedonia U21 internationally.

Club career

Early career
Earlier in his career, Slavkovski was nicknamed "Ibrahimović II", because of his similar stature and style of play to the Swedish striker, and as he also played for FBK Balkan and Malmö FF.

Inter Milan
Slavkovski made his first team debut with Inter Milan at the age of 17 years and one month on 7 May 2006 in a Serie A league match against Siena, taking the field at the 83rd minute, thus becoming the youngest footballer ever to play for Inter. This record has since been broken by Federico Bonazzoli. Previously, the record was held by Giuseppe Bergomi.

He made his Coppa Italia debut against Messina Peloro, on 29 November 2006.

Sheffield United
On 30 January 2008, Inter reached a loan agreement with Middlesbrough which fell through after he failed a medical and would be unlikely to challenge for a first team place. The next day Inter announced to have loaned Slavkovski to Sheffield United. On 18 March 2008, Sheffield United manager Kevin Blackwell claimed that he was still not ready to play in the first team stating that he would play in the reserve team where he could be assessed. Slavkovski returned to Italy at the end of the season without having made a first team appearance for the Blades. He did, however, make six appearances for the reserve team, scoring twice.

2008–09 season and beyond
On 27 June 2008, Slavkovski confirmed a five-year deal with Hajduk Split. It was subsequently confirmed that he was in a very weak physical condition as a result of unsporting behavior and that it would have taken weeks for him to regain fitness. The announced transfer was later cancelled due to his condition, and Slavovski remained contracted with Inter. In October 2008, he started training with Malmö FF, confirming he was still an Inter player and announcing that he will stay on in Sweden for the remainder of the year.

His contract with Inter expired in June 2009, and was not extended; since then, he allegedly rejected a number of offers from Serie B and Lega Pro Prima Divisione clubs. On 22 January 2010, it was announced that VfL Bochum II had signed Slavkovski. He signed a six-month contract with the option to renew the contract. Slavkovski also had a trial with Barnet. He was however released by the end of the season, after failing to play a single game for the club's first team. Since then, his career has faded into obscurity and, in 2011, he returned to Sweden where he briefly joined third division amateurs IF Limhamn Bunkeflo.

International career
Recently the media reported a "war" going on between the Macedonian and Swedish football federations, in attempt to get him to join their national football teams. Slavkovski and his father stated that it would be an honour to play for his country of origin, Macedonia.

Slavkovski also met the Macedonian Prime Minister where they talked about his chances playing for the Macedonian national team. The Prime Minister handed him a football jersey with his name on the backside.

On 11 June 2008, Slavkovski finally spoke out about his international career and decided to play for Macedonia.
In August 2008 Slavkovski made his debut for the Macedonia U21 national team, in the qualification matches against Estonia and Norway. He has made three scoreless appearances hitherto.

Career statistics

Club

References

External links
Inter News

 

1989 births
Living people
Footballers from Malmö
Swedish people of Macedonian descent
Association football forwards
Swedish footballers
Sweden youth international footballers
Macedonian footballers
North Macedonia under-21 international footballers
Malmö FF players
Inter Milan players
Sheffield United F.C. players
VfL Bochum II players
IF Limhamn Bunkeflo (men) players
Serie A players
Swedish expatriate footballers
Macedonian expatriate footballers
Expatriate footballers in Italy
Macedonian expatriate sportspeople in Italy
Swedish expatriate sportspeople in Italy
Expatriate footballers in England
Macedonian expatriate sportspeople in England
Expatriate footballers in Germany
Macedonian expatriate sportspeople in Germany